Neil J. Armstrong (April 15, 1920 – November 23, 1994) was a Canadian aviator. He was killed in 1994 with his son, Corcoran, when the Twin Otter they were in crashed into an Antarctic iceberg.

Awards and honours

 Canada's Aviation Hall of Fame in 1973
 Order of Icarus in 1974
 Yukon Territory Order of Polaris

Notes

References
 Neil J. Armstrong Scholarship, including biography, Canadian Owners and Pilots Association (COPA) website

External links 
 http://www.copanational.org/NAbackground.cfm

1920 births
Aviation history of Canada
Canadian aviators
Canadian World War II pilots
Royal Canadian Air Force officers
Bush pilots
1994 deaths